The 2006 Florida Attorney General election took place on November 7, 2006, to elect the Attorney General of Florida. The election was won by Bill McCollum who took office on January 3, 2007.

Republican primary

Candidates
Bill McCollum, former U.S. Representative

Results
McCollum was unopposed in the Republican Party primary.

Democratic primary

Candidates
Skip Campbell, State Senator
Merrilee Ehrlich, attorney

Results

General election

Results

References

Attorney
Florida
Florida Attorney General elections